The following is a list of all team-to-team transactions that have occurred in the National Hockey League (NHL) during the 1944–45 NHL season. It lists which team each player has been traded to and for which player(s) or other consideration(s), if applicable.

Transactions 

Notes
 Trade completed on October 29, 1945.
 Trade completed on January 4, 1945.

References

Transactions
1944 in ice hockey
1945 in ice hockey
National Hockey League transactions